Gold Coast University Hospital light rail station (also known GCUH or University Hospital) is a major public transport interchange, providing an important bus - light rail interchange for the Gold Coast suburb of Southport. GCUH is part of the Gold Coast's G:link light rail network and was the original northern terminus of the G:link until an extension was completed to Helensvale in 2017. The Gold Coast University Hospital station is the only underground light rail station for network and provides a bus interchange located on the street level.

Translink provides an integrated public transport network for the whole of South East Queensland. Surfside buslines under contract from Translink provides suburban bus services from the GCUH bus station to the surrounding suburbs. The light rail service, known as the G:link runs from Broadbeach South to Helensvale via the key activity precincts of Southport and Surfers Paradise.

Location 
GCUH light rail station is located under Parklands Drive, while the bus station is located on street-level. The station services the Gold Coast Health and Knowledge precinct and provides direct access to the Gold Coast University Hospital and the northern portion of Griffith University, Gold Coast campus.

Below is a map of the Gold Coast Health and Knowledge precinct. The station can be identified by the grey marker.{
  "type": "FeatureCollection",
  "features": [
    {
      "type": "Feature",
      "properties": {},
      "geometry": {
        "type": "Point",
        "coordinates": [
          153.38085114955905,
          -27.960806283892186
        ]
      }
    }
  ]
}

Transport links 
Below is a list of public transport connections available from the Gold Coast University Hospital interchange.

External links 

 G:link
 Translink

References 

G:link stations
Public transport on the Gold Coast, Queensland
Railway stations in Australia opened in 2014
Southport, Queensland